Texas Tornados is the debut album by supergroup Texas Tornados, released in August, 1990, through Reprise Records. This album was recorded in both English and Spanish, with Los Texas Tornados being the title of the Spanish version. In 1992, the track "Soy de San Luis", earned the band a Grammy Award for Best Mexican/Mexican-American Album.

Track listing

Charts and certifications

Weekly charts

Year-end charts

References

1990 albums
Texas Tornados albums
Spanish-language albums
Elektra Records albums